Tobyhanna National Forest was established in Pennsylvania by the United States Forest Service on April 10, 1925, with  from part of the Tobyhanna Military Reservation. On October 10, 1928, the executive order for its creation was rescinded and the forest was abolished.

References

External links
Forest History Society
Listing of the National Forests of the United States and Their Dates (from the Forest History Society website) Text from Davis, Richard C., ed. Encyclopedia of American Forest and Conservation History. New York: Macmillan Publishing Company for the Forest History Society, 1983. Vol. II, pp. 743-788.

Former National Forests that were military bases
Former National Forests of Pennsylvania
1925 establishments in Pennsylvania